Northern Iraq may refer to:
Assyrian homeland
Iraqi Kurdistan
Kurdistan Region
Upper Mesopotamia

Geography of Iraq